Cipeundeuy Station (CPD) is a class II railway station located in Cikarag, Malangbong, Garut Regency. The station, which is located at an altitude of +772 meters, is included in the Bandung Operational Area II. This station has three railway tracks.

Despite the station's diminutive size and unassuming appearance, all trains from every classes of service must stop at the station for brake checking. This procedure is mandatory due to the presence of steep gradients on both ends of the station.

This has been carried out since the Dutch East Indies era to the present. However, it was briefly abolished in 1990s as it was deemed inefficient, and the nuisance caused by hawkers and beggars at this station. The absence of brake checkings contributed to the fatal accident of the Galuh and Kahuripan combined train which lost control and went runaway due to brake failures after leaving the station on midnight on 24 October 1995, before crashing at the bridge near the Trowek (now Cirahayu) station.

Since then, to prevent similar accidents, all trains are again mandated to stop at the station. 

This station also serves ticket selling and reservations at the counter.

Services 
The following is a list of train services at the Cipeundeuy Station.

Passengers services
 Executive class
 Mixed class
 Economy class
 Serayu, to  via – and to  via 

Freight services
 Over-night service, to  via –– and to

References

External links
 

Garut Regency
Railway stations in West Java
Railway stations opened in 1893